Farmington Senior High School is a public high school located in Farmington, Minnesota, United States. It is part of Farmington Area Public Schools. The school was located at 200 Denmark Avenue, until 2009, when the school opened at 20655 Flagstaff Avenue.

Farmington's team name is the Tigers.

References

External links

Schools in Dakota County, Minnesota
Educational institutions in the United States with year of establishment missing
Public high schools in Minnesota
1973 establishments in Minnesota